This is a list of characters from , a Japanese tokusatsu drama and the 39th entry in the Super Sentai franchise.

Main characters

Ninningers
Not long after, they are joined by an American Yokai Hunter who seeks to become Yoshitaka's apprentice.

In combat, the Ninningers' arsenal revolves around their  and honing their . Additionally, they wield the  pistol, which also doubles as Yokai detection system, and the Fūma shuriken-like , which can switch between sword, bow, and claw modes.

Takaharu Igasaki
 is the leader of the Ninningers and an impulsive optimist who acts like a big brother to his teammates and serves as the red-colored . Out of the group, he is most adamant about being a ninja and wishes to become the type that his grandfather is. Following the Ninningers' final battle with Gengetsu Kibaoni, Takaharu opens a ninjutsu school and goes on to get married and have a son named Yoshiharu.

Using the Chozetsu Shobu Changer, Takaharu can transform into , gaining the ability to perform the  finisher.

Yakumo Kato
 is a cold yet quick-tempered realist who was originally in England to learn magic before he was called back to Japan despite displaying no desire to carry on Yoshitaka's legacy. Instead, Kato prefers to prove himself as the most skilled practitioner of the Shuriken Ninja Arts while serving as the blue-colored . Following the Ninningers' final battle with Gengetsu Kibaoni, Kato returns to England to finish magic school with a combination of magic and his ninja skills.

Using the Chozetsu Shobu Changer, Ao Ninger can transform into .

During the events of the crossover film Kamen Rider × Super Sentai: Ultra Super Hero Taisen, the Game World version of Yakumo temporarily assumes the form of the blue-colored , a hybrid of Aorenger and the Double Riders. In this form, he commands Kamen Rider Kiva's Castle Doran.

Nagi Matsuo
 is a friendly and observant prankster, high schooler, and youngest member of the team with a desire to master various things who serves as the yellow-colored . Following the Ninningers' final battle with Gengetsu Kibaoni, Matsuo studies with Fuka Igasaki to enter university.

Using the Chozetsu Shobu Changer, Ki Ninger can transform into .

Fuka Igasaki
 is Takaharu's reliable yet clumsy younger sister and high schooler who initially believes the Igasaki clan's history was a fairy tale before joining the Ninningers as the white-colored . Following the Ninningers' final battle with Gengetsu Kibaoni, Fuka studies with Nagi Matsuo to enter university while setting her sights on becoming an idol.

Kasumi Momochi
 is a reserved yet sharp tongued university student who aims to become a scientist despite being unable to take a hint and serves as the pink-colored . Following the Ninningers' final battle with Gengetsu Kibaoni, Momoichi travels to England with Yakumo Kato so she can continue researching her team's arsenal through scientific means.

Kinji Takigawa
In his quest to become a legendary Yokai hunter, Kinji seeks out Yoshitaka to become his apprentice and followed him to Japan, where the former learns to speak in an old Japanese Edo dialect after watching jidaigeki and rakugo. While undergoing Yoshitaka's tests, Kinji goes on to form bonds with and join the Ninningers and assist them in their battles with Gengetsu Kibaoni. Following their final battle with him, Kinji inherits Yoshitaka's oden business and starts operating it in the United States.

Unlike the other Ninningers, Kinji utilizes the  cellphone, which has a Yokai alert system and can be used to summon his Otomonin, in order to transform into the gold-colored . Using the Chozetsu Shobu Changer, he can transform into  and perform the  finisher.

Otomonin
The  are mecha created by Yoshitaka using alien technology that are normally hidden in the city until they are summoned by the Ninningers via their Ichibantou in conjunction with a corresponding  and a summoning jutsu. The Ninningers later create their secondary Otomonin themselves by giving them life with their own spirits. The Otomonin can also combine via .
: Takaharu's humanoid ninja-themed Otomonin.
: Kato's European dragon-themed Otomonin capable of breathing  and perform the  attack.
: Nagi's dump truck-themed Otomonin capable of tossing .
: Fuka's -themed Otomonin that normally rides in Byunmaru.
: Kasumi's maglev-themed Otomonin capable of tossing .
: An elephant-themed Otomonin capable of performing the  attack and assuming a robot mode.
: A flying saucer-themed Otomonin and the prototype of the other Otomonin capable of assuming a robot mode.
: Kinji's humanoid bull rider-themed Otomonin that rides the ATV/bull/karakuri machine-themed , both of which he created using Yoshitaka's autobiography. 
Additionally, Lion HaOjo's essence can assume a human form named .
: Takaharu's Vermillion Bird/glider-themed secondary Otomonin.
: Kato's Azure Dragon/motorcycle-themed secondary Otomonin.
: Nagi's Black Tortoise/tank-themed secondary Otomonin.
: Fuka's White Tiger/4WD vehicle-themed secondary Otomonin.
: Kasumi's panda/helicopter-themed secondary Otomonin.
: Kinji's carp/submarine-themed secondary Otomonin.
Tridoron: Kamen Rider Drive's car that is temporarily enlarged and converted into an Otomonin capable of assuming a robot mode. This Otomonin appears exclusively in the crossover film Super Hero Taisen GP: Kamen Rider 3.
: A Tyrannosaurus-themed Otomonin capable of assuming a robot mode and was originally Tatsunosuke Hakkaku's cursed form, the "terrible dragon", before Shinobimaru broke off Hakkaku's horn.

Shuriken Combinations
While Shinobimaru serves as the primary "pilot", other Otomonin can take the former's place while it becomes the left arm.
: An alternate formation with Dragomaru as the "pilot" that is capable of performing the  finisher.
: The combination of Shurikenzin and Paonmaru that is armed with twin , which allow it to perform the  finisher.
: The combination of Shurikenzin and UFOmaru that is armed with the  shotgun, which allows it to perform the  finisher.
: The combination of Shurikenzin and Surfermaru that can perform the  finisher.
: The combination of Shurikenzin and Kamen Rider Drive's Tridoron that is controlled by the Ninningers and Drive and can perform the  finisher. This combination appears exclusively in the crossover film Super Hero Taisen GP: Kamen Rider 3.
This combination appears exclusively in the films Shuriken Sentai Ninninger the Movie: The Dinosaur Lord's Splendid Ninja Scroll! and Come Back! Shuriken Sentai Ninninger: Ninnin Girls vs. Boys FINAL WARS.
: The combination of Bison King and Dragomaru that is armed with the Drago Sword.
: The Ninningers' most powerful giant robot and the combination of King Shurikenzin and Lion HaOjo that can perform the  finisher.
: The combination of Bison King, Lion HaOjo, ToQ-Oh, and Build Ressha that is controlled by the Ninningers and ToQgers and can perform the  finisher. This combination appears exclusively in the crossover film Shuriken Sentai Ninninger vs. ToQger the Movie: Ninja in Wonderland.
: The combination of Gekiatsu DaiOh, Bison King, and Lion HaOjo that can perform the  attack and the  finisher.

Recurring characters

Kibaoni Army Corps
After being revived as an oni in the 20th century, Gengetsu Kibaoni and his forces were sealed within forty-eight  by the Ninningers' grandfather Yoshitaka Igasaki.

Gengetsu Kibaoni
 is the leader and namesake of the Kibaoni Army Corps who was originally a human feudal warlord during the Sengoku period who believed that fear was the best method to unite the war-torn Japan. After being killed by Igasaki clan ninjas, Gengetsu vowed to return in 444 years to resume his campaign. Centuries later, he sacrificed his humanity to return as an oni before he was sealed by Yoshitaka Igasaki. Nevertheless, due a miscalculation, Gengetsu returned once more in 2015 with Kyuemon Izayoi's help.

Initially lacking a physical form, Gengetsu tasks his retainers with gathering fear so he can reconstitute himself. Eventually succeeding after absorbing his wife Ariake no Kata's grief over losing their son Mangetsu before absorbing Ariake herself and Kyuemon, Gengetsu enlarges himself to face the Ninningers in a final battle, during which he is permanently killed by Gekiatsu DaiOh after Kyuemon breaks free of his body.

Kyuemon Izayoi
Growing up, Kyuemon became Yoshitaka's first apprentice, but became fearful of the "Last Ninja's" power when Yoshitaka refused to give him the End Shuriken and stole Tsumuji Igasaki's ninjutsu. Following this, Kyuemon's Yokai power emerged, transforming him into a kitsune-masked form with mastery of  spells and developed a hatred towards his former mentor.

In the present, Kyuemon orders the destruction of the Igasaki Ninjutsu Dojo to obtain a ceremonial mallet so he can free Gengetsu and serve as his page while searching for the End Shuriken, believing he has a right to it due to his connection to Yoshitaka, and corrupting the Sealing Shuriken used to seal Gengetsu for the Kibaoni Army Corps' benefit. Amidst his battles with the Ninningers, Kyuemon manipulates Raizo Gabi, forms an alliance with Kinji Takigawa, acts against Masakage Tsugomori and Ariake no Kata, and revives four of the Oniwaban Five as his servants to suit his needs.

During the Kibaoni Army Corps' final battle with the Ninningers, Kyuemon steals Yoshitaka's Nintality and the End Shuriken, using both to assume a more powerful form, but is confronted with the fact that he followed in Yoshitaka's footsteps in seeking the End Shuriken to bring his family back. Upon admitting this as the truth, Kyuemon acknowledges Yoshitaka as his mentor and receives his own Nin Shuriken, but is absorbed by Gengetsu. Kyuemon eventually frees himself, allowing the Ninningers to kill Gengetsu. After making peace with Yoshitaka, Kyuemon returns the End Shuriken to the Ninningers before dying while his Nin Shuriken is enshrined in his memory.

Two years later, during the events of the V-Cinema Come Back! Shuriken Sentai Ninninger: Ninnin Girls vs. Boys FINAL WARS, Sakurako Igasaki gives Kyuemon's Nin Shuriken to Luna Kokonoe so she can become Mido Ninger. The Ninningers later learn Kyuemon's spirit was contained within the Nin Shuriken and he had possessed Kokonoe so he can fight alongside them and redeem himself. After defeating the revived Ariake and Mangetsu and returning the mallet, Kyuemon's spirit is allowed to reincarnate.

Raizo Gabi
 is the Goryō-themed spearhead of the Kibaoni Army Corps who bears the most hatred towards the Igasaki clan and craves fighting powerful enemies, to the point where he will kill allies if he believes they are interfering with his desire. Despite being partially revived by Kyuemon, Raizo refuses to aid him, believing that fighting the Ninningers will fully awaken him. As a result, the latter develops a rivalry with Takaharu Igasaki and reluctantly aids Kyuemon so he can have a proper battle with the ninja. After fighting Takaharu twice and losing to him during their second encounter, Raizo gracefully accepts defeat, but is forcibly enlarged and brainwashed into becoming a berserker by Kyuemon. Ultimately, Raizo is killed by King Shurikenzin and returns to the afterlife. Following Gengetsu's full revival, he revives Raizo a second time via a corrupted Sealing Shuriken, giving him a more powerful form. Raizo battles Takaharu and Yakumo Kato, who kills Raizo in combat.

In combat, Raizo wields two katana and can perform the  attack.

Masakage Tsugomori
 is Gengetsu's Koromodako-themed chief retainer and strategist who sees the destruction of the Igasaki clan as his top priority and comes off as playful, but is secretly dangerous and deceptive in combat. Additionally, he is a tiny Yokai piloting a mechanical replica of his original form. Following Raizo Gabi's death, Kyuemon revives Masakage to help him gather fear to revive Gengetsu. Despite knowing Kyuemon is not a true member of the Kibaoni Army Corps, Masakage allows him to stay so long as he does not betray Gengetsu. After Gengetsu is fully revived, Masakage becomes his second-in-command and personally battles the Ninningers until they discover his secret. Desperate, Masakage enlarges himself, but is killed by HaOh Gekiatsu DaiOh.

In combat, Masakage wields a shakujō and various magical powers and can perform the  attack.

Ariake no Kata
 is Gengetsu's impatient and vain Aonyōbō-themed wife who is always accompanied by two Hyakkarage bodyguards. In response to the Ninningers' growing power, Kyuemon reluctantly revives her, though she primarily yells at him and Masakage to fix things whenever events do not go right, uses gathered fear as a beauty treatment or to flavor shaved ice, focuses on pampering herself in preparation for her husband's revival, and dotes on her son Mangetsu despite his abuse. Upon learning of Mangetsu's death, her rage and grief creates excess fear energy, allowing Gengetsu to fully revive. Amidst the Kibaoni Army Corps' final battle with the Ninningers, she is mortally wounded by Star Ninger and Momo Ninger before Gengetsu absorbs his wife.

Two years later, during the events of the V-Cinema Come Back! Shuriken Sentai Ninninger: Ninnin Girls vs. Boys FINAL WARS, Ariake revives herself to seek revenge on the Ninningers, only to be killed again by them.

In combat, Ariake wields the  war fan.

Mangetsu Kibaoni
 is Gengetsu Kibaoni and Ariake no Kata's son, Kyuemon Izayoi's younger half-brother, and a cruel and cunning warrior whose primary desire is to gather fear directly from the Ninningers to revive his father. After several battles with the Ninningers and enlarging himself, he is mortally wounded by HaOh Gekiatsu DaiOh. Before he dies, Kyuemon tells Mangetsu the truth of their familial relationship.

Two years later, during the events of the V-Cinema Come Back! Shuriken Sentai Ninninger: Ninnin Girls vs. Boys FINAL WARS, Mangetsu is revived by Ariake, but is killed alongside her by the Ninningers.

In combat, Mangetsu wields a great sword, can perform the  attack, and is able to withstand an attack from the Ninningers in their Chozetsu forms.

Foot soldiers
: Ashigaru-themed foot soldiers who are armed with spears and arquebuses and are created from Gengetsu's energy leaking from the Yo Shuriken. 
: Hitokarage enhanced by a Kibaoni general's power who are armed with sasumata-like swords and arquebuses.
: Enlarged versions of the Hitokarage.
: Elite Jukkarage who are ten times stronger than them.
: Kitsune-masked ninja/foot soldiers of the Izayoi-Style who are armed with ninjatō.
: Giant, skeletal Yokai armed with twin-bladed billhooks that are summoned by Kyuemon. A number of the Gashadokuro can also combine to form a zanbatō for other enlarged Yokai to use.

Yokai
The  are monsters created from a corrupted Sealing Shuriken coming into contact with an inanimate object. Acting on Gengetsu's will, Yokai serve to gather the "Power of Fear" by attacking people. Once a Yokai is killed, the Sealing Shuriken that formed its core is purified.
 
: A Yokai created from a Sealing Shuriken and a chainsaw following the breaking of Gengetsu's seal. After being defeated by the Igasaki Ninningers, Kamaitachi is enlarged before he is killed by Shurikenzin.
: A Yokai created from a Sealing Shuriken and a fire extinguisher with a sumo-esque fighting style and cryokinesis. After being defeated by Aka Ninger and Ao Ninger, Kappa is enlarged before he is killed by Shurikenzin Drago.
: A Yokai created from a Sealing Shuriken and a pair of inline skates who is armed with blades capable of putting anything under his control. After being killed by Raizo Gabi for interfering with the former's fight with Aka Ninger, Kyuemon takes Kasha's Sealing Shuriken and converts it into the Gashadokuro Yo Shuriken.
: A Yokai created from a Sealing Shuriken and a refrigerator who can inhale targets and trap them in his cavernous stomach. After being defeated by the Igasaki Ninningers, Tsuchigumo is enlarged before he is killed by Shurikenzin Paon.
: A Yokai created from a Sealing Shuriken and a parabolic antenna who wields  sword, which allows him to emit radio waves capable of manipulating opponents like puppets. After being defeated by the Igasaki Ninningers, Ungaikyō is enlarged before he is killed by Shurikenzin UFO.
: A Yokai that Raizo created from a Sealing Shuriken and a clarinet who is armed with the  fan and the ability to produce a tone from his nose capable of pulling targets into another dimension. After being defeated by Ao Ninger and Momo Ninger, Tengu is enlarged before he is killed by Shurikenzin Paon.
: A Yokai created from a Sealing Shuriken and a watch who possesses time travel capabilities and the ability to reverse his death, which rendered him immune to the Ninningers' Yokai detection technology, and Kyuemon recruited to find the End Shuriken. Despite being destroyed by the Igasaki Ninningers, who reclaim his Sealing Shuriken, Nekomata revives himself before allowing Aka Ninger and Momo Ninger to kill him once more so he can infiltrate the Ninningers' dojo. However, the Ninningers destroy his stomach clock before killing him a third time, Kyuemon revives and enlarges Nekomata, who is killed permanently by Shiro Ninger via Shurikenzin Paon.
: A Yokai that Kyuemon created from a Sealing Shuriken infused with Raizo Gabi's power and a carpet who possesses magic and is armed with the  broom wand. After being defeated by Aka Ninger and Ao Ninger, Ittan-momen is enlarged before he is killed by Bison King.
: A Yokai created from a Sealing Shuriken and an excavator. After being defeated by Star Ninger, Daidarabotchi is enlarged before he is killed by Shurikenzin Paon and Bison King.
: A Yokai that Kyuemon created from a Sealing Shuriken and a kettle who can emit , which can amplify targets' negative thoughts and paralyze them with the fear of being forgotten. After being defeated by Ao Ninger and Star Ninger, Enraenra is enlarged before he is killed by Shurikenzin and Bison King.
: A Yokai that Masakage created from a Sealing Shuriken and a pair of track shoes. After being defeated by Aka Ninger and Star Ninger, Yamawarawa is enlarged before he is killed by King Shurikenzin.
: A Yokai that Masakage created from a Sealing Shuriken and a payphone who is capable of mimicking others' voices and fire concussive soundwaves. After being defeated by Aka Ninger and Shiro Ninger, Yamabiko is enlarged before he is killed by Shurikenzin and Bison King.
: A business-minded Yokai that Masakage created from a Sealing Shuriken and a pair of glasses who can control targets who have signed contracts with her. After taking control of Rodeomaru, Momo Ninger uses Futakuchi-onna's pride and insecurity to trick her into destroying her contracts before the Yokai is killed by the Igasaki Ninningers.
: A Yokai that Masakage created from a Sealing Shuriken and Tsumuji Igasaki's fountain pen who can summon rain, turn himself into an umbrella, and wields . After being defeated by Aka Ninger with help from Tsumuji, Kasabake is enlarged before he is killed by King Shurikenzin.
: A Yokai that Masakage created from a Sealing Shuriken and an inflatable raft who is armed with the double-bladed  naginata and can create fog-based illusions. After being defeated by Aka Ninger and Star Ninger, Umibōzu is enlarged before he is killed by Shurikenzin Surfer.
: A Yokai created from a Sealing Shuriken and Yakumo Kato's lawn mower who can control one person for a short period of time before his thrall collapses from the strain. Despite initial reluctance, Ao Ninger eventually defeats him. Otoroshi is subsequently enlarged by Kyuemon and killed by Shurikenzin Surfer.
: A Yokai created from a Sealing Shuriken and a bag who can devour victims' dreams and ambitions. After being defeated by Aka Ninger Chozetsu and Star Ninger, Baku is enlarged before he is killed by Lion HaOh.
: A Yokai that Kyuemon created from a Sealing Shuriken and a boom barrier who can trap victims within walls that represent obstacles in their lives. After being defeated by Aka Ninger Chozetsu, Ao Ninger, and Star Ninger, Nurikabe is enlarged before he is killed by HaOh Shurikenzin.
: A Yokai that Kyuemon created from a Sealing Shuriken and a kakigōri maker who is armed with the  naginata. After being defeated by Aka Ninger Chozetsu, Ki Ninger, and Momo Ninger, Yuki-onna is enlarged before she is killed by HaOh Shurikenzin.
: A Yokai created from a Sealing Shuriken and a stopwatch who resembles Nekomata but lacks his powers. He poses as Yoshitaka in the hopes of separating the Ninningers and killing them individually until he is exposed by Momo Ninger. After stealing Kyuemon's mallet, Mataneko enlarges himself and Aka Ninger Chozetsu, but is killed by the latter. Mataneko is voiced by Tomokazu Seki.
: A Yokai that Masakage created from a Sealing Shuriken and a computer keyboard. After being defeated by Ki Ninger, Mokumokuren is enlarged before he is killed by Gekiatsu DaiOh.
: A Yokai that Masakage created from a Sealing Shuriken and a Swiss Army knife. After being defeated by Ao Ninger Chozetsu, Amikiri is enlarged before he is killed by HaOh Gekiatsu DaiOh.
: A Yokai created from a Sealing Shuriken and Shurikenger's Yokai Karuta. Fudagaeshi is killed by Aka Ninger Chozetsu.

Western Yokai
The  are a trio of Yokai who flourished in western civilizations, having terrorized Europe and America before they are summoned to Japan by Ariake no Kata.
: The flashlight-themed Ace of the Three Western Yokai who can fire a beam from his abdomen capable of stopping a machine's movement. After being defeated by Aka Ninger Chozetsu, Ki Ninger, and Momo Ninger, Franken is enlarged by Kyuemon before he is killed by HaOh Shurikenzin.
: The syringe-themed King of the Three Western Yokai who is armed with the  rapier. Having transcended both his vulnerability to sunlight and need to drink blood, Dracula now has the ability to turn into a swarm of bats and absorb his victim's life energy via a bite, leaving them in a permanent, nightmare-filled slumber. After being defeated by Aka Ninger Chozetsu, Shiro Ninger, and Star Ninger, Dracula is enlarged by Kyuemon before he is killed by Lion HaOh.
: The kitchen knife-themed Joker of the Three Western Yokai who is invulnerable against human attacks and has killed many Yokai Hunters, including Kinji's father and older brother. After he is defeated by Star Ninger Chozetsu, Okami-otoko is enlarged by Kyuemon before he is killed by HaOh Shurikenzin.

Advanced Yokai
The  are Yokai created from two tainted Sealing Shuriken coming into contact with an item instead of one. Stronger than ordinary Yokai, they also have the ability to enlarge themselves without Kyuemon's help.
: An Advanced Yokai that Gengetsu created from two Sealing Shuriken and a toolbox. After he is defeated by Aka Ninger Chozetsu, Nue enlarges himself before he is killed by Lion HaOh.
: An Advanced Yokai that Masakage created from two Sealing Shuriken and a dumbbell who is armed with the  gloves. After he is defeated by Aka Ninger Chozetsu, Konaki-jiji enlarges himself before he is killed by Gekiatsu DaiOh.
: An Advanced Yokai that Masakage created from two Sealing Shuriken and a power strip.
After being defeated by Super Star Ninger, Oboroguruma enlarges himself and allows Masakage to pilot him before he is killed by HaOh Gekiatsu DaiOh. Kyuemon later creates  for Raizo Gabi to pilot, though it is eventually destroyed by Gekiatsu DaiOh.
: An Advanced Yokai that Masakage created from two Sealing Shuriken and a Christmas stocking. After being defeated by Aka Ninger Chozetsu, Binbogami enlarges himself before he is killed by the six Ninningers' primary Otomonin, Paonmaru, UFOmaru, and Surfermaru.
: A  that Mangetsu created from four Sealing Shuriken and a Kibaoni Army Corps nobori who is armed with the  kanabō. Shuten-doji enlarges himself before he is killed by Gekiatsu DaiOh.

Other Yokai
: A Yokai-Roidmude hybrid created from a Sealing Shuriken that Roidmude 089 and Kyuemon created from a Sealing Shuriken and a Spider Viral Core who is armed with twin swords, can secrete a slimy goo capable of instilling fear in whoever comes in contact with it, and producing a Heavy Acceleration field and appears exclusively in the two-part Shuriken Sentai Ninninger vs. Kamen Rider Drive: Spring Break Combined 1 Hour Special. Buruburu is killed by the Ninningers and Kamen Riders Drive and Mach before Kyuemon gives the Sealing Shuriken to 089.
: A Yokai created from a Sealing Shuriken and a Cryner who can turn himself into the  train and appears exclusively in the crossover film Shuriken Sentai Ninninger vs. ToQger the Movie: Ninja in Wonderland. He is killed by the Zyuohgers.

Oniwaban Five

: A falcon-themed ninja who is defeated by the Ninningers, enlarged by Kyuemon, and killed by King Shurikenzin and Lion HaOh.
: An Indian rhinoceros-themed ninja who wields the twin . After being defeated by the Ninningers, Ikkakusai is enlarged before he is killed by HaOh Shurikenzin.
: A black carpenter ant-themed ninja who possesses the left arm-mounted  pincer. After being defeated by Aka Ninger Chozetsu, Kuroari is enlarged before he is killed by King Shurikenzin and Lion HaOh.
: A badger-themed ninja who wields a teapot-esque kusarigama equipped with a bladed shield. After being defeated by the Igasaki Ninningers, Mujina steals Kyuemon's mallet to enlarge himself before he is killed by the Karakuri Kyubi.
: A hornet-themed ninja who is revived by Masakage and possesses a left arm-mounted crossbow capable of firing  arrows. After being defeated by Ao Ninger, Suzumebachi is enlarged before she is killed by Gekiatsu DaiOh.

Tsumuji Igasaki
 is Takaharu and Fuka's father and Yoshitaka's oldest son who trained since childhood to succeed his father. After Kyuemon steals his ninjutsu, Tsumuji creates the Ninja Ichibantou and serves as an advisor and teacher to the Ninningers, who eventually reclaim Tsumuji's powers and allow him to join them in their final battle against the Kibaoni forces as his own version of Aka Ninger.

Yoshitaka Igasaki
Decades prior, he gave his life to seal Gengetsu Kibaoni when the latter became an oni. However, Yoshitaka used the End Shuriken to keep himself alive so he could secretly build the Otomonin using alien technology in preparation for Gengetsu's return before revealing himself to his grandchildren in the present to give them their Otomonin Shuriken, claiming he had faked his death so he can guide them towards becoming true ninja. Additionally, he single-handedly builds a new  following the original one's destruction to serve as the Ninningers' headquarters. While training his grandchildren, he promises to eventually choose one of them to become his successor if they exceed his expectations, improve their Nintality, and fully master the Shuriken Ninja Arts. However, he later reveals they can only do so if one of them kills him and absorbs his Nintality. After they demonstrate their conviction for surpassing him, he acknowledges and joins forces with the Ninningers in their final battle against Gengetsu as his own version of Aka Ninger until Kyuemon Izayoi steals Yoshitaka's Nintality, forcing Yoshitaka to reveal the truth of what happened. Before he dies, Yoshitaka gives a purified Sealing Shuriken to Kyuemon, which transforms into his own Nin Shuriken.

Yoshitaka Igasaki is portrayed by  while his eldest son, portrays a younger Yoshitaka.

Tetsunosuke Saika XXII
 is a karakuri technician and son of Tetsunosuke Saika XXI who helped Yoshitaka create the Otomonin. After succeeding his father, Saika XXII performs maintenance on the Ninningers' equipment. He would later create the Chozetsu Shobu Changer and help the Ninningers create their secondary Otomonin.

Guest characters
He and Yousuke Shiina appear before the Ninningers to train them and protect Takaharu from Nekomata.
He and Sasuke appear before the Ninningers to train them and protect Takaharu from Nekomata.
: Yakumo Kato's mother, Tsumuji Igasaki's older sister, and a worldwide fashion designer who initially disapproves of her son's involvement with ninjutsu before seeing him in battle.
: A descendant of the ancient  ninja clan who can transform into the armored ninja . After initially being mistaken for one of Kyuemon's ninjas, Yamaji joins forces with the Ninningers to fight Konaki-jiji before Takaharu convinces him to retire and allow the next generation of ninjas to take the lead against the forces of evil.
: An ally of the Hurricanegers who Toha Yamaji sent to check on the Ninningers' progress.

Spin-off exclusive characters
He originally cared for his subjects, but abandoned his family, which led to him being cursed to transform into an anthropomorphic dinosaur-esque form called the "terrible dragon" after succumbing to his greed, anxiety and fear. In the present, the Ninningers shrink him to human size as part of their summer homework. Tatsunosuke later joins the Ninningers in protecting his village from Juza Yumihari, which allows him to break the curse with Takaharu's help.
First appearing in the film Shuriken Sentai Ninninger the Movie: The Dinosaur Lord's Splendid Ninja Scroll!, he attacks Shinobigakure Village to find the "terrible dragon", only to be thwarted by the Ninningers. He enlarges himself, but is killed by Shurikenzin Dino. Two years later, during the events of the V-Cinema, Come Back! Shuriken Sentai Ninninger: Ninnin Girls vs. Boys FINAL WARS, Yumihari returns from the dead to seek revenge on the Ninningers. Nonetheless, he is killed by the Ninnin Girls.
: Takaharu and Fuka's mother, Tsumuji's wife, and a ninja fanatic who appears exclusively in the V-Cinema Come Back! Shuriken Sentai Ninninger: Ninnin Girls vs. Boys FINAL WARS. She turns Fuka, Kasumi Momoichi, and Luna Kokonoe into the  idol group to challenge the male Ninningers.
: A young woman who was recruited into Sakurako Igasaki's Ninnin Girls as the green-colored , only to be possessed by Kyuemon Izayoi after receiving his Nin Shuriken, and appears exclusively in the V-Cinema Come Back! Shuriken Sentai Ninninger: Ninnin Girls vs. Boys FINAL WARS. Luna Kokonoe is portrayed by Megumi Han, who also voices Kyuemon Izayoi.
: Takaharu's son from 12 years in the future and successor as Aka Ninger who appears exclusively in the crossover film Doubutsu Sentai Zyuohger vs. Ninninger the Movie: Super Sentai's Message from the Future. Yoshiharu uses his ninja powers to travel back in time to the present and avert the Ninningers and Zyuohgers' deaths.

Notes

References

Shuriken Sentai Ninninger